Hasrate Parvaz (in English means: Begrudging Flight), is a studio album by Iranian singer, Ebi, released in 2006.

Track listing

References

2006 albums
Ebi albums